Hordynia is a village (selo) in Sambir Raion, Lviv Oblast, in south-west Ukraine. Hordynia belongs to Novyi Kalyniv urban hromada, one of the hromadas of Ukraine. 

The local Catholic parish was first mentioned in 1400.

References 

 Hordynia